Montgradail is a commune in the Aude department in southern France.

Population

Places and monuments
On a house to the right of the church, there is a nice sundial dating back to 1685.

See also
Communes of the Aude department

References

Communes of Aude
Aude communes articles needing translation from French Wikipedia